Centrouropoda is a genus of tortoise mites in the family Uropodidae. There are at least two described species in Centrouropoda.

Species
These two species belong to the genus Centrouropoda:
 Centrouropoda brasiliana Wisniewski & Hirschmann, 1992
 Centrouropoda peruana Wisniewski & Hirschmann, 1992

References

Uropodidae
Articles created by Qbugbot
Acari genera